Joakim Persson (born 4 May 1970) is a retired Swedish ice hockey player. Persson was part of the Djurgården Swedish champions' team of 1991. Persson made 3 Elitserien appearances for Djurgården.

References

External links

1970 births
AIK IF players
Boston Bruins draft picks
Djurgårdens IF Hockey players
Living people
Providence Bruins players
Swedish ice hockey goaltenders
VIK Västerås HK players
People from Upplands Väsby Municipality
Sportspeople from Stockholm County